Ethmia praeclara is a moth in the family Depressariidae. It is found in Taiwan, the Philippines, Indonesia, New Guinea and Australia.

References

Moths described in 1910
praeclara